Johnson County is a county in the north central part of the U.S. state of Wyoming. At the 2020 United States Census, the population was 8,447. The county seat is Buffalo. Kaycee is the only other incorporated town in the county.

Johnson County lies to the southeast of the Bighorn Mountains along Interstate 25 and Interstate 90. The Powder River flows northward through eastern Johnson County.

History
Johnson County was created on December 8, 1875, as Pease County from parts of Albany, Carbon and Sweetwater Counties. It was organized in 1881. The county was named for Dr. E. L. Pease of Uinta County. In 1879, the county was renamed Johnson, for E. P. Johnson, a Cheyenne attorney.

In 1888, Sheridan County was created from a portion of Johnson County. In 1890, Big Horn County was created from Johnson County along with land from Fremont County and Sheridan County. In 1911, the boundaries of Johnson County and adjacent Crook, Natrona and Weston Counties were adjusted to run along federal land survey lines.

In April 1892, Johnson County was the scene of the Johnson County War, a range war between large cattle outfits and small stockgrowers.

Flag
Johnson County flag is based on the ikurriña; since the birth of Jean Esponda from Baigorri, there has been a large Basque population in the county.

Geography

Adjacent counties

Sheridan County (north)
Campbell County (east)
Converse County (southeast)
Natrona County (south)
Washakie County (west)
Big Horn County (northwest)

Major highways

 Interstate 25
 Interstate 90
 U.S. Highway 16
 U.S. Highway 87
 Wyoming Highway 192
 Wyoming Highway 193
 Wyoming Highway 196
 Wyoming Highway 387

National protected area
Bighorn National Forest (part)

Demographics

2000 census
At the 2000 United States Census, there were 7,075 people, 2,959 households and 2,006 families in the county. The population density was 2 per square mile (1/km2). There were 3,503 housing units at an average density of 0.8 per square mile (0.3/km2). The racial makeup of the county was 97.03% White, 0.08% Black or African American, 0.64% Native American, 0.11% Asian, 0.55% from other races, and 1.58% from two or more races. 2.09% of the population were Hispanic or Latino of any race. 27.0% were of German, 15.2% English, 10.8% Irish and 7.9% American ancestry.

There were 2,959 households, of which 28.70% had children under the age of 18 living with them, 57.00% were married couples living together, 7.10% had a female householder with no husband present, and 32.20% were non-families. 28.50% of all households were made up of individuals, and 12.00% had someone living alone who was 65 years of age or older. The average household size was 2.36 and the average family size was 2.89.

24.20% of the population were under the age of 18, 5.60% from 18 to 24, 23.50% from 25 to 44, 28.70% from 45 to 64, and 18.00% who were 65 years of age or older. The median age was 43 years. For every 100 females there were 96.60 males. For every 100 females age 18 and over, there were 94.30 males.

The median household income was $34,012 and the median family income was $42,299. Males had a median income of $29,271 and females $20,469. The per capita income was $19,030. About 7.20% of families and 10.10% of the population were below the poverty line, including 9.10% of those under age 18 and 10.60% of those age 65 or over.

2010 census
At the 2010 United States Census, there were 8,569 people, 3,782 households, and 2,410 families in the county. The racial makeup was 96.5% white, 1.1% American Indian, 0.4% Asian, 0.2% black or African American, 0.7% from other races, and 1.1% from two or more races. Those of Hispanic or Latino origin made up 3.2% of the population. In terms of ancestry, 31.6% were German, 22.4% were Irish, 18.3% were English, and 6.1% were American.

Of the 3,782 households, 26.1% had children under the age of 18 living with them, 53.5% were married couples living together, 6.7% had a female householder with no husband present, 36.3% were non-families, and 31.8% of all households were made up of individuals. The average household size was 2.25 and the average family size was 2.83. The median age was 44.8 years.

The median household income was $45,638 and the median family income was $58,983. Males had a median income of $40,572 and females $30,352. The per capita income was $26,753. About 5.9% of families and 8.2% of the population were below the poverty line, including 8.0% of those under age 18 and 7.3% of those age 65 or over.

Communities

City
 Buffalo (county seat)

Town
 Kaycee

Unincorporated communities
 Hazelton
 Linch
 Saddlestring
 Sussex

Government and infrastructure
Johnson County voters are reliably Republican. Since Wyoming statehood, the voters of this county have selected the Democratic Party candidate in only three national elections: William Jennings Bryan in 1896; Woodrow Wilson in 1912 by two votes and with only 37.5 percent of the total vote (due to Roosevelt's independent run that year); and Franklin D. Roosevelt by seventy votes in his 1932 landslide. FDR did not carry the county in his re-election campaigns; in 1936 Johnson was Alf Landon’s second-best county in the Western United States behind Rio Blanco County, Colorado. In the 1964 Democratic landslide it was Barry Goldwater’s best county in Wyoming, and second-best in the West behind Utah’s traditional banner Republican county of Kane.

The Wyoming Department of Health Veteran's Home of Wyoming, an assisted living facility for veterans and their dependents, is in Buffalo. The Wyoming Board of Charities and Reform operated the facility until the agency was dissolved as a result of a state constitutional amendment passed in November 1990.

See also
 
 National Register of Historic Places listings in Johnson County, Wyoming
Wyoming
List of cities and towns in Wyoming
List of counties in Wyoming
Wyoming statistical areas

References

External links
 
 Buffalo, Wyoming Chamber of Commerce Website

 
1881 establishments in Wyoming Territory
Populated places established in 1881